Građanski Osijek, full name Hrvatski građanski športski klub  (English: Croatian Citizens' Sports Club) was a Croatian football club established in Osijek in 1917 and dissolved in 1945. Among its most successful players were later internationals Franjo Glaser and Ernest Dubac.

Građanski won Osijek's first city championship in 1920. In 1924 it became a founding member of the Osijek Football Subfederation. The club was banned by the authorities of communist Yugoslavia in 1945

See also
NK Osijek
Građanski Zagreb

Association football clubs established in 1917
Association football clubs disestablished in 1945
Defunct football clubs in Croatia
Sport in Osijek
1917 establishments in Croatia
1945 disestablishments in Croatia